Anthony McConnor Knight (born 17 November 1970) is a Jamaican hurdler. He competed in the men's 110 metres hurdles at the 1992 Summer Olympics.

References

External links
 

1970 births
Living people
Athletes (track and field) at the 1992 Summer Olympics
Jamaican male hurdlers
Olympic athletes of Jamaica
Place of birth missing (living people)